This is the results breakdown of the local elections held in Castilla–La Mancha on 28 May 1995. The following tables show detailed results in the autonomous community's most populous municipalities, sorted alphabetically.

Overall

City control
The following table lists party control in the most populous municipalities, including provincial capitals (shown in bold). Gains for a party are displayed with the cell's background shaded in that party's colour.

Municipalities

Albacete
Population: 141,179

Ciudad Real
Population: 62,072

Cuenca
Population: 44,960

Guadalajara
Population: 67,401

Talavera de la Reina
Population: 75,138

Toledo
Population: 64,040

See also
1995 Castilian-Manchegan regional election

References

Castilla-La Mancha
1995